Masechele Caroline Ntseliseng Khaketla (1918 – August 13, 2012) was a writer and educator from Lesotho.

Biography
Born in the Berea District of Lesotho, Khaketla went to primary school in Liphiring and Siloe in Mohale's Hoek District, finishing with an unusual first-class pass. From 1933 to 1935 she studied in Morija, becoming the first Mosotho woman to gain a junior certificate. She then attended Fort Hare University College, where in 1941 she became the first Mosotho woman to graduate with a bachelor of arts degree, in education. 

She spent time as a practice teacher at Lovedale Missionary Institute, where among her pupils was Godfrey Kolisang. She next taught briefly at Thabana Morena Girls' School, before going on to Morija Training College in Morija. There she met Bennett Makalo Khaketla, who became her husband. Together they taught at Basutoland High School in Maseru, until he was dismissed for political activities, whereupon they went to Nigel in South Africa for work. In 1953 he returned to Lesotho to begin a political career, and she returned to Basutoland High School. 

Later in the decade, with a colleague she developed an experimental primary school, Iketsetseng ("do it yourselves"), which by 1988 had over one thousand pupils. Among its students were the future Queen 'Mamohato of Lesotho and her son, later Letsie III. Khaketla lost control of the school in 1992, and opened another in her own house.

Khaketla wrote 11 books, including poetry collections, in Sesotho. In 1979 she became the first Mosotho woman to be appointed an assessor on the High Court; she served on the council of the National University of Lesotho and on the government's National Planning Board. She was active on the Special Committee on the Status of Women on the Law Reform Commission. She was active in the Anglican Church and its Mothers' Union. In 1983 she was the first Mosotho to be awarded an honorary doctorate of literature by the National University. In 1997 she received the Gold Record of Achievement award from the American Biographical Institute.

Khaketla was the mother of six children, including 'Mamphono Khaketla. After her death she was honoured with a mass at the Anglican Cathedral of St Mary and St James in Maseru, before burial in Kokobela Cemetery.

List of works

'Mantsopa le Molamu oa Kotjane
Mosiuoa Masilo
Mosali eo o 'Neileng Eena
Pelo ea Monna
Ka u Lotha
Mahlopha a Senya
Ho Isa Lefung
Molekane ea Tsoanang le Eena
Khotsoaneng
Selibelo sa Nkhono
Maoelana a hlompho (2002)

References

1918 births
2012 deaths
Lesotho women writers
Lesotho poets
Lesotho women poets
20th-century poets
20th-century women writers
21st-century poets
21st-century women writers
Lesotho educators
Women educators
People from Berea District
University of Fort Hare alumni
Lesotho expatriates in South Africa